Sabrina Crognale (born 8 August 1985) is an Italian modern pentathlete. At the 2012 Summer Olympics, she competed in the women's competition, finishing in 27th place.

References

External links
 
 Sabrina Crognale at Fiamme Oro

1985 births
Living people
Italian female modern pentathletes
Olympic modern pentathletes of Italy
Modern pentathletes at the 2012 Summer Olympics
Sportspeople from Rome
Modern pentathletes of Fiamme Oro
20th-century Italian women
21st-century Italian women